Anthony Armour is a rugby league footballer, he played for London Broncos in the Super League.

References

External links
http://www.rugbyleagueproject.org/players/anthony-armour/summary.html

1982 births
Living people
Australian rugby league players
London Broncos players
Rugby articles needing expert attention
Rugby league players from Sydney